The Gruiformes  are an order containing a considerable number of living and extinct bird families, with a widespread geographical diversity. Gruiform means "crane-like".

Traditionally, a number of wading and terrestrial bird families that did not seem to belong to any other order were classified together as Gruiformes. These include 14 species of large cranes, about 145 species of smaller crakes and rails, as well as a variety of families comprising one to three species, such as the Heliornithidae, the limpkin, or the Psophiidae.
Other birds have been placed in this order more out of necessity to place them somewhere; this has caused the expanded Gruiformes to lack distinctive apomorphies. Recent studies indicate that these "odd Gruiformes" are if at all only loosely related to the cranes, rails, and relatives ("core Gruiformes").

Systematics
There are only two suprafamilial clades (natural groups) among the birds traditionally classified as Gruiformes. Rails (Rallidae), flufftails (Sarothruridae), finfoots and sungrebe (Heliornithidae), adzebills (Aptornithidae), trumpeters (Psophiidae), limpkin (Aramidae), and cranes (Gruidae) compose the suborder Grues and are termed "core-Gruiformes". These are the only true Gruiformes. The suborder Eurypygae includes the kagu (Rhynochetidae) and sunbittern (Eurypygidae). These are not even remotely related to Grues. The families of mesites or roatelos (Mesitornithidae), button-quails (Turnicidae), Australian plains-wanderer (Pedionomidae), seriemas (Cariamidae), and bustards (Otididae) each represent distinct and unrelated lineages. Many families known only from fossils have been assigned to the Gruiformes, e.g., Ergilornithidae, Phorusrhacidae, Messelornithidae, Eogruidae, Idiornithidae, Bathornithidae, to name just a few (see below). Though some of these are superficially 'crane-like' and the possibility that some may even be related to extant families traditionally included in the Gruiformes, there are no completely extinct families that can be confidently assigned to core-Gruiformes.

The traditional order Gruiformes was established by the influential German avian comparative anatomist Max Fürbringer (1888). Over the decades, many ornithologists suggested that members of the order were in fact more closely related to other groups (reviewed by Olson 1985, Sibley and Ahlquist 1990). For example, it was thought that sunbittern might be related to herons and that seriemas might be related to cuckoos. Olson and Steadman (1981) were first to correctly disband any of the traditional Gruiformes. They recognized that the Australian plains-wanderer (family Pedionomidae) was actually a member of the shorebirds (order Charadriiformes) based on skeletal characters. This was confirmed by Sibley and Ahlquist (1990) based on DNA–DNA hybridization and subsequently by Paton et al. (2003), Paton and Baker (2006) and Fain and Houde (2004, 2006). Sibley and Ahlquist furthermore removed button-quails (Turnicidae) from the Gruiformes based on large DNA–DNA hybridization distances to other supposed Gruiformes. However, it was not until the work of Paton et al. (2004) and Fain and Houde (2004, 2006) that the correct placement of buttonquails within the shorebirds (order Charadriiformes) was documented on the basis of phylogenetic analysis of multiple genetic loci. Using 12S ribosomal DNA sequences, Houde et al. (1997) were the first to present molecular genetic evidence of gruiform polyphyly, although apparently they were not convinced by it. However, on the basis of numerous additional sequence data, it has been shown decisively that the traditionally recognized Gruiformes consist of five to seven unrelated clades (Fain and Houde 2004, Ericson et al. 2006, Hackett et al. 2008).

Fain and Houde (2004) proposed that Neoaves are divisible into two clades, Metaves and Coronaves, although it has been suggested from the start that Metaves may be paraphyletic (Fain and Houde 2004, Ericson et al. 2006, Hackett et al. 2008). Sunbittern, kagu, and mesites all group within Metaves but all the other lineages of "Gruiformes" group either with a collection of waterbirds or landbirds within Coronaves. This division has been upheld by the combined analysis of as many as 30 independent loci (Ericson et al. 2006, Hackett et al. 2008), but is dependent on the inclusion of one or two specific loci in the analyses. One locus, i.e., mitochondrial DNA, contradicts the strict monophyly of Coronaves (Morgan-Richards et al. 2008), but phylogeny reconstruction based on mitochondrial DNA is complicated by the fact that few families have been studied, the sequences are heavily saturated (with back mutations) at deep levels of divergence, and they are plagued by strong base composition bias.

The kagu and sunbittern are one another's closest relatives. It had been proposed (Cracraft 2001) that they and the recently extinct adzebills (family Aptornithidae) from New Zealand constitute a distinct Gondwanan lineage. However, sunbittern and kagu are believed to have diverged from one another long after the break-up of Gondwanaland and the adzebills are in fact members of the Grues (Houde et al. 1997, Houde 2009). The seriemas and bustards represent distinct lineages within neoavian waterbirds.

Phylogeny

ORDER GRUIFORMES
 Family †Songziidae Hou, 1990
 Genus †Songzia Hou, 1990
Suborder Grui
 Superfamily Gruoidea Vigors, 1825
 Family †Geranoididae  Wetmore, 1933
 Family †Parvigruidae Mayr, 2005
 Genus †Parvigrus Mayr, 2005
 Genus †Rupelrallus Fischer, 1997
 Family Aramidae Bonaparte, 1854 (limpkin)
 Genus †Badistornis Wetmore, 1940
 Genus Aramus Vieillot, 1816 [Courlili Buffon, 1781; Notherodius Wagler, 1827] (limpkins)
 Family Psophiidae Bonaparte, 1831 (trumpeters)
 Genus Psophia Linnaeus, 1758 
 Family †Eogruidae Wetmore, 1934
 Genus †Sonogrus Kuročkin, 1981
 Genus †Eogrus Wetmore, 1932 [Progrus Bendukidze, 1971]
 Subfamily †Ergilornithinae
 Genus †Ergilornis Kozlova, 1960
 Genus †Amphipelargus Lydekker, 1891
 Genus †Urmiornis Mecquenem, 1908
 Family Gruidae (cranes)
 Genus †Camusia Seguí, 2002
 Subfamily Balearicinae Brasil, 1913
 Genus †Aramornis Wetmore, 1926
 Genus †Geranopsis Lydekker, 1871
 Genus †Eobalearica Gureev, 1949
 Genus Balearica Brisson, 1760 [Geranarchus Gloger, 1842] (crowned cranes)
 Subfamily Gruinae Vigors, 1825
 Genus †"Grus" conferta Miller & Sibley, 1942 [Olson & Rasmussen, 2001]
 Genus †"Probalearica" mongolica Kurochkin, 1985
 Genus †Palaeogrus Portis, 1885 [Palaeogrus Salvadori, 1884 nomen nudum]
 Genus Antigone (Linnaeus, 1758)
 Genus Leucogeranus (Pallas, 1773)
 Genus Grus Brisson, 1760 non Moehring, 1758 [Anthropoides Vieillot, 1816; Bugeranus Gloger, 1841; Megalornis Gray, 1841; Leucogeranus Bonaparte, 1855; Mathewsena Iredale, 1914; Mathewsia Iredale, 1911; Limnogeranus Sharpe, 1893; Laomedontia Reichenbach, 1852; Philorchemon Gloger, 1842; Scops Gray, 1840 non Moehring, 1758 non Bruennich, 1772 npn Savigny, 1809] (cranes)
Suborder Ralli
 Family †Aptornithidae (adzebills)
 Family Sarothruridae (flufftails)
 Genus Mentocrex Peters, 1933 (wood rails)
 Genus Sarothrura Heine, 1890 non Hasselt, 1823 [Corethrura Reichenbach, 1849 non Hope, 1843 non Gray, 1846; Daseioura Penhallurick, 2003] (flufftails)
 Family Heliornithidae Gray, 1841 (finfoots and sungrebe)
 Genus Heliopais Sharpe, 1893  (Asian/masked finfoots)
 Genus Podica Lesson, 1831 [Rhigelura Wagler, 1832; Podoa Bonaparte, 1857 non Illiger, 1811] (African finfoots)
 Genus Heliornis Bonnaterre, 1791 [Podoa Illiger, 1811 non Bonaparte, 1857; Plotoides Brookes, 1830; Podia Swainson, 1837] (sungrebe, American finfoot)
 Family Rallidae (crakes, moorhens, gallinules, and rails)
 Genus †Aletornis Marsh, 1872 [Protogrus]
 Genus †Australlus Worthy & Boles, 2011
 Genus †Baselrallus De Pietri & Mayr, 2014
 Genus †Belgirallus Mayr & Smith, 2001
 Genus †Capellirallus Falla, 1954 (snipe-billed rail)
 Genus †Creccoides Shufeldt, 1892
 Genus †Eocrex Wetmore, 1931
 Genus †Euryonotus Mercerat, 1897
 Genus †Fulicaletornis Lambrecht, 1933
 Genus †Hovacrex Brodkorb, 1965 (Hova gallinule)
 Genus †Ibidopsis Lydekker, 1891
 Genus †Latipons Harrison & Walker, 1979
 Genus †Miofulica Lambrecht, 1933
 Genus †Miorallus Lambrecht, 1933
 Genus †Nesophalaris Brodkorb  & Dawson, 1962
 Genus †Palaeoaramides Lambrecht, 1933
 Genus †Palaeorallus Wetmore, 1931
 Genus †Paraortygometra Lambrecht, 1933
 Genus †Parvirallus Harrison & Walker, 1979
 Genus †Pastushkinia Zelenkov, 2013
 Genus †Quercyrallus Lambrecht, 1933
 Genus †Rallicrex Lambrecht, 1933 
 Genus †Rhenanorallus Mayr, 2010 
 Genus †Vitirallus Worthy, 2004 (Viti Levu rails)
 Genus †Wanshuina Hou, 1994
 Genus †Youngornis Yeh, 1981
 Genus †Rallidae gen. et sp. indet. [Fulica podagrica (partim)] (Barbados rail)
 Genus †Rallidae gen. et sp. indet. (Easter Island rail)
 Genus †Rallidae gen. et sp. indet. (Fernando de Noronha rail)
 Genus †Rallidae gen. et sp. indet. (Tahitian "goose”)
 Genus †Rallidae gen. et sp. indet. (Bokaak "bustard")
 Genus †Rallidae gen. et sp. indet. ('Amsterdam Island' rail)
 Genus Rougetius Bonaparte, 1856 (Rouget's Rails)
 Subfamily Rallinae Rafinesque, 1815
 Genus †Pleistorallus Worthy, 1997 (Fleming's rails)
 Genus Anurolimnas Sharpe, 1893 (Chestnut-headed Crakes)
 Genus Biensis (Madagascan Rails)
 Genus Rallicula Schlegel, 1871 [Corethruropsis Salvadori, 1876] (forest-rails)
 Genus Rallus Linnaeus, 1758 [†Epirallus Miller, 1942]
 Genus †Aphanapteryx von Frauenfeld, 1868 [Pezocrex Hachisuka, 1953] (Mauritius/Red rails)
 Genus †Erythromachus Milne-Edwards, 1873 (Rodriquez rails)
 Genus Dryolimnas Sharpe, 1893
 Genus Crex Bechstein, 1803 [Crecopsis Sharpe, 1893] (greater crakes)
 Genus Lewinia Gray, 1855 [Aramidopsis Sharpe, 1893; Donacias Heine & Reichenow, 1890; Hyporallus Iredale & Mathews, 1926]
 Genus Canirallus Bonaparte, 1856 (grey-throated rail)
 Genus Gymnocrex Salvadori, 1875 (bare-faced rails)
 Genus Gallirallus Lafresnaye, 1841 [Tricholimnas Sharpe, 1893; Nesoclopeus Peters, 1932; Cabalus Hutton, 1874; Habropteryx Stresemann, 1932; Eulabeornis Gould, 1844; †Diaphorapteryx Forbes, 1893; Hypotaenidia Reichenbach, 1853; Sylvestrornis Mathews, 1928]
 Subfamily Gallinulinae Gray, 1840
 Tribe Pardirallini Livezey, 1998 [Aramidinae] (Wood-rails & allies)
 Genus Pardirallus Bonaparte, 1856 [Ortygonax Heine, 1890]
 Genus Mustelirallus Bonaparte, 1858 [Neocrex Sclater & Salvin, 1869; Cyanolimnas Barbour & Peters, 1927]
 Genus Amaurolimnas Sharpe 1893 (Rufous rails; Uniform crakes)
 Genus Aramides Pucheran, 1845
 Tribe Gallinulini Gray, 1840 [Fulicarinae (Nitzsch, 1820) sensu Livezey, 1998]
 Genus Tribonyx Du Bus de Gisignies, 1840 [Brachyptrallus Lafresnaye, 1840; Microtribonyx Sharpe, 1893] (native-hens)
 Genus Porzana Vieillot, 1816 [Limnobaenus Sundevall, 1872; Phalaridion Kaup, 1829; Porzanoidea Mathews, 1912; Porzanoides Condon, 1975; Rallites Pucheran, 1845; Schoenocrex Roberts, 1922; Porphyriops Pucheran, 1845]
 Genus Paragallinula Sangster, García-R & Trewick, 2015 (Lesser Moorhen)
 Genus Gallinula Brisson, 1760 [Hydrogallina Lacépède, 1799; Stagnicola Brehm, 1831; Porphyriornis Allen, 1892 Pareudiastes Hartlaub & Finsch, 1871 Edithornis]
 Genus Fulica Linnaeus, 1758 [†Palaeolimnas Forbes, 1893]
 Subfamily Porphyrioninae Reichenbach, 1849
 Tribe Porphyrionini Reichenbach, 1849 (Purple gallinules & swamphens)
 Genus †Aphanocrex Wetmore, 1963 (St. Helena swamphens)
 Genus Porphyrio Brisson, 1760 [Notornis Owen, 1848]
 Tribe Himantornithini Bonaparte, 1856 (Bush-hens & Waterhens)
 Genus Himantornis Hartlaub, 1855 (Nkulenga rails)
 Genus Megacrex D'Albertis & Salvadori, 1879 (New Guinea Flightless Rails)
 Genus Aenigmatolimnas (Striped Crakes)
 Genus Gallicrex Blyth, 1852 [Gallinulopha Bonaparte, 1854; Hypnodes Reichenbach, 1853] (Watercocks)
 Genus Amaurornis Reichenbach, 1853 [Erythra Reichenbach, 1853; Pisynolimnas Heine & Reichenow, 1890; Poliolimnas Sharpe, 1893] (Bush-hen)
 Tribe Zaporniini Des Murs, 1860 (Old world crakes)
 Genus Rallina Gray, 1846 [Euryzona Gray, 1855; Tomirdus Mathews, 1912] (chestnut-rails)
 Genus Zapornia Stephens, 1824 [Limnocorax Peters, 1854; Limnobaenus;  Corethrura Grey, 1846]
 Tribe Laterallini Tif, 2014 (New world crakes)
 Genus Micropygia Bonaparte, 1856 (Ocellated Crakes)
 Genus Rufirallus (russet-crowned crake)
 Genus Laterallus Gray, 1855 (ruddy crakes)
 Genus Coturnicops Gray, 1855 (barred-backed crakes)
 Genus Hapalocrex (Yellow-breasted Crakes)
 Genus Limnocrex
 Genus Mundia Bourne, Ashmole & Simmons, 2003 (Ascension Island Crakes)
 Genus Creciscus Cabanis, 1857 [Atlantisia Lowe, 1923] (blackish crakes)
Not placed in family
Genus †Nesotrochis Wetmore, 1918 (West Indian cave-rails)

When considered to be monophyletic, it was assumed that Gruiformes was among the more ancient of avian lineages. The divergence of "gruiforms" among "Metaves" and "Coronaves" is proposed to be the first divergence among Neoaves, far predating the Cretaceous–Paleogene extinction event c. 66 mya (Houde 2009). No unequivocal basal gruiforms are known from the fossil record. However, there are several genera that are not unequivocally assignable to the known families and that may occupy a more basal position:
 Propelargus (Late Eocene/Early Oligocene of Quercy, France) – cariamid or idornithid
 Rupelrallus (Early Oligocene of Germany) – rallid? parvigruid?
 Badistornis (Brule Middle Oligocene of Shannon County, Missouri) – aramid?
 Probalearica (Late Oligocene? – Middle Pliocene of Florida, France?, Moldavia and Mongolia) – gruid? A nomen dubium?
 "Gruiformes" gen. et sp. indet. MNZ S42623 (Bathans Early/Middle Miocene of Otago, New Zealand) – Aptornithidae?
 Aramornis (Sheep Creek Middle Miocene of Snake Creek Quarries, U.S.) – gruid? aramid?
 Euryonotus (Pleistocene of Argentina) – rallid?

Other even more enigmatic fossil birds and five living families are occasionally suggested to belong into this order, such as the proposed Late Cretaceous family Laornithidae and the following taxa:
 Family †Gastornithidae (diatrymas) (fossil)
 Family †Messelornithidae (Messel-birds)
 Family †Salmilidae (fossil) – distinct order (Cariamiformes)
 Family †Geranoididae (fossil) – distinct order (Cariamiformes); however, Mayr (2016) argued they might be members of Gruiformes, specifically stem group representatives of the Gruoidea.
 Family †Bathornithidae (fossil) – distinct order (Cariamiformes)
 Family †Idiornithidae (fossil) – distinct order (Cariamiformes)
 Family †Phorusrhacidae (terror birds) (fossil) – distinct order (Cariamiformes)
 Family Cariamidae (seriemas) – Neoavian landbirds – distinct order (Cariamiformes)
 Family Otididae (bustards) – Neoavian waterbirds – distinct order
 Family Eurypygidae (sunbittern) – prospective "Metaves" – new order Eurypygiformes together with kagu
 Family Rhynochetidae (kagu) – prospective "Metaves" – new order Eurypygiformes together with sunbittern
 Family Mesitornithidae (mesites, roatelos, monias) prospective "Metaves" – distinct order
Family Turnicidae (buttonquails) moved to already existing order Charadriiformes together with plains wanderer
Family Pedionomidae (plains wanderer) moved to already existing order Charadriiformes together with buttonquails
 Horezmavis (Bissekty Late Cretaceous of Kyzyl Kum, Uzbekistan)
 Telmatornis (Navesink Late Cretaceous?)
 Amitabha (Bridger middle Eocene of Forbidden City, Wyoming) – rallid?
 Eobalearica (Ferghana Late? Eocene of Ferghana, Uzbekistan) – gruid?
 "Phasianus" alfhildae (Washakie B Late Eocene of Haystack Butte, U.S.)
 Talantatos (Late Eocene of Paris Bain, France)
 Telecrex (Irdin Manha Late Eocene of Chimney Butte, China) – rallid?
 Neornithes incerta sedis (Late Paleocene/Early Eocene of Ouled Abdoun Basin, Morocco)
 Aminornis (Deseado Early Oligocene of Rio Deseado, Argentina) – aramid?
 Loncornis (Deseado Early Oligocene of Rio Deseado, Argentina) – aramid?
 Riacama (Deseado Early Oligocene of Argentina)
 Smiliornis (Deseado Early Oligocene of Argentina)
 Pseudolarus (Deseado Early Oligocene – Miocene of Argentina) – gruiform?
 Gnotornis (Brule Late Oligocene of Shannon County, Missouri) – aramid?
 Anisolornis (Santa Cruz Middle Miocene of Karaihen, Argentina) – aramid?
 Occitaniavis – cariamid or idiornithid, includes Geranopsis elatus

See also
 List of Gruiformes by population

References

 
Houde, P. (2009) "Gruiformes". in Timetree of Life (S. B. Hedges and S. Kumar, eds.) Oxford Univ. Press, New York.

 
Olson, S. L. (1985) "The fossil record of birds". Avian biology (D. S. Farner and King, J. R. and K. C. Parkes, eds.) 8: 79–238, Academic Press, Orlando.

 Sibley, Charles Gald and Ahlquist, Jon Edward (1990): Phylogeny and classification of birds. Yale University Press, New Haven, Conn.

External links
 Tree of Life: Gruiformes 

 
Bird orders
Extant Maastrichtian first appearances
Late Cretaceous taxonomic orders
Paleocene taxonomic orders
Eocene taxonomic orders
Oligocene taxonomic orders
Miocene taxonomic orders
Pliocene taxonomic orders
Pleistocene taxonomic orders
Holocene taxonomic orders
Taxa named by Charles Lucien Bonaparte